Hearts of Gold was a BBC television programme devised and presented by Esther Rantzen, with Michael Groth and Carol Smillie as co-presenters. Running for six years in the 1980s and 1990s, the programme commended members of the public for their good deeds.

Rantzen devised the show in 1988. The premise of the show was to commend those who had done good deeds to others. They would usually be tricked into appearing on the show using a practical joke, a device which some critics (such as The Independents Geraldine Bedell) compared to Beadle's About. Journalist Bedell explains that participants "are inviegled into the studio under false pretences and presented with gold hearts on blue ribbons while they wonder where to put themselves. (There is also a sub-Beadle segment in which Esther and chums dress up as folk in distress and wait for passers-by to come to their aid)."  
For some of its life, the show was filmed at The Fountain Studios in Wembley.

Transmission details
 Series 1:  29 October - 17 December 1988: 7 Episodes. 
 Series 2:  28 October - 24 December 1989: 9 Episodes. 
 Series 3:  14 October - 23 December 1990: 6 Episodes. (five normal episodes plus a Christmas special) 
 Series 4:  6–20 December 1991: 3 Episodes 
 Series 5:  4–18 December 1992: 3 Episodes 
 Series 6:  5 October  - 9 November 1993: 6 Episodes 
 Series 7:  8 March - 26 April 1995 : 8 Episodes 
 Series 8:  27 March - 1 May 1996 : 6 Episodes

Theme song
The 1988 theme song was written by Lynsey de Paul and released as a single by Gold on the CBS record label in 1988. The B-side of the single was the song "Sacks of Gold", also a De Paul composition.

References

External links

BBC Television shows
1988 British television series debuts
1996 British television series endings